The 1941 NCAA Cross Country Championships were the fourth annual cross country meet to determine the team and individual national champions of men's collegiate cross country running in the United States.

Since the current multi-division format for NCAA championship did not begin until 1973, all NCAA members were eligible. In total, 19 teams and 94 individual runners contested this championship.

The meet was hosted by Michigan State College at the Forest Akers East Golf Course in East Lansing, Michigan for the fourth consecutive time. Additionally, the distance for the race was 4 miles (6.4 kilometers).

The team national championship was won by the Rhode Island State Rams, their first, while the individual championship was won by Fred Wilt, from Indiana, with a time of 20:32.1.

Men's title
Distance: 4 miles

Team Result

References
 

NCAA Cross Country Championships
NCAA Cross Country Championships
Sports competitions in East Lansing, Michigan
NCAA Cross Country
November 1941 sports events
Michigan State University
Track and field in Michigan